KOKP 1020 AM is a radio station licensed to Perry, Oklahoma. The station broadcasts a sports format and is owned by Team Radio, LLC.

Translators

References

External links
KOKP's website

OKP
Sports radio stations in the United States